WePlay Ultimate Fighting League (WUFL) is a fighting game esports league. Supported titles:Tekken 7, Soulcalibur VI.

History 
On December 13, 2020, the last day of the WePlay Dragon Temple tournament in Mortal Kombat 11, the creation of the WePlay Ultimate Fighting League (WUFL) was announced. The partnership for fighting games was announced by the league co-founders: WePlay Esports (also known as WePlay AniMajor founder) Managing Partners Oleg Krot and Yura Lazebnikov, and the world cruiserweight boxing champion Oleksandr Usyk.

The league's scope of activity is holding fighting game tournaments. Oleg Krot and Yura Lazebnikov, league co-founders, have extensive experience in conducting esports events to date.

League co-founders’ joint investment in the project amounts to $25 million. It is reported that the invested funds will be used for the development of infrastructure, tech solutions to enhance production quality, game data collection and analysis. There are also plans to build specialized WUFL venues, provide prize funds, and promote content on the market.

WUFL Season 1 (2021) 

The first season of the WePlay Ultimate Fighting League will run from March 25 to April 11, 2021.

The WePlay Esports media holding company and the undisputed world cruiserweight boxing champion Oleksandr Usyk are the organizers of the league.

The first season of the league will feature competitions in Mortal Kombat 11, Soulcalibur VI, and Tekken 7.

Dates of individual competitions:
 Mortal Kombat 11 — March 25–28, 2021
 SOULCALIBUR VI — April 1–4, 2021
 Tekken 7 — April 8–11, 2021

The total prize pool for Ultimate Fighting League (WUFL) Season 1 will be $150,000. This amount will be distributed between all three competitions for the individual games. WePlay Ultimate Fighting League Season 1 will be streamed from WePlay Esports Arena Kyiv at the VDNG.

Pakistani player Arslan Ash won the Tekken 7 tournament, defeating his compatriot.

WUFL Season 1 (2021) Results

Streaming partner 

Sports OTT streaming service DAZN is the official broadcaster of the WePlay Ultimate Fighting League. It became known on March XX, 2021, when esports media holding company WePlay Esports and DAZN announced a partnership.

The league broadcast will be available for viewing on all types of devices supported by the DAZN service:
 Samsung, LG, Android TV, Chromecast, Amazon Fire TV, and Apple TV streaming devices and TVs
 Computers using Chrome, Firefox, Internet Explorer, Edge, and Safari browsers
 iOS and Android smartphones and tablets
 PlayStation4, PlayStation5, Xbox One и Xbox Series X game consoles.

Industry Analytics

The largest number of concurrent viewers of Tekken 7 competitions in 2020 was 55,200 people. The peak viewer count of Mortal Kombat 11 in 2020 was 60,300 people. The events of the main players in the esports market, including WePlay (Dragon Temple and Ultimate Fighting League), are detailed in the analytical article "Fighting Community Against COVID-19: A New Underdog Story" in the leading profile publication Dbltap. Games of the Ultimate Fighting League were rated as a success.

References 

  WePlay Ultimate Fighting League
  WePlay Ultimate Fighting League Instagram
  WePlay Ultimate Fighting League Twitter
  WePlay Ultimate Fighting League Reddit

Esports leagues
Fighting game tournaments